Breathing Lessons is a Pulitzer Prize–winning 1988 novel by American author Anne Tyler. It is her eleventh novel and won the 1989 Pulitzer Prize for Fiction.

Plot
The story describes the joys and pains of the ordinary marriage of Ira and Maggie Moran as they travel from Baltimore to attend a funeral and back home again in one day. It also examines Maggie's attempts to reconcile her son and daughter-in-law. During the journey to the funeral, we learn how both Ira and Maggie have forgone their youthful dreams and feel they have settled for an "ordinary life."  We experience how they exasperate each other—Maggie too talkative, too meddling; Ira too logical, uncommunicative, and too judgmental.   A few detours during their 90-mile drive reveal Ira and Maggie's "incompatibilities, disappointments, unmet expectations—and lasting love".

Edward Hoagland describes the novel: "Maggie, surprised by life, which did not live up to her honeymoon, has become an incorrigible prompter.  And she has horned in to bring about the birth of her first grandchild by stopping a 17-year-old girl named Fiona at the door of an abortion clinic and steering her into marrying Maggie's son, Jesse, who is the father and, like Fiona, a dropout from high school....The book's principal event is a 90-mile trip that Maggie and Ira make from Baltimore...to a country town in Pennsylvania where a high school classmate has suddenly scheduled an elaborate funeral for her husband.  Maggie...indulges her habit of pouring her heart out to every listening stranger, which naturally infuriates Ira, who, uncommunicative to start with, has reached the point where Maggie can divine his moods only from the pop songs of the 1950s that he whistles....Maggie, although exasperating,...is trying to make a difference, to connect or unite people, beat the drum for forgiveness and compromise. As Ira explains, "It's Maggie's weakness. She believes it's all right to alter people's lives. She thinks the people she loves are better than they really are, and so then she starts changing things around to suit her point of view of them."

Adaptations

In 1994, a television movie based on the book was made for the Hallmark Hall of Fame. It was directed by John Erman, and starred James Garner and Joanne Woodward as Ira and Maggie Moran. Both were nominated for Emmy Awards during the 46th Primetime Emmy Awards for Outstanding Lead Actor in a Miniseries or Special and Outstanding Lead Actress in a Miniseries or Special. Joanne Woodward won a Golden Globe Award and a Screen Actors Guild Award for her performance. Additional nominations were given for Outstanding Television Movie and Outstanding Individual achievement in Writing in a Miniseries or a Special. It was filmed in the Pittsburgh PA area.  

Kevin McKeon also adapted the novel into a stage play. From June 6 – 29, 2003, he directed its premier run at the Book-It Repertory Theatre, at Seattle Center House Theatre, Seattle Center, in Seattle, Washington.

Reviews
In her review in The New York Times, Michiko Kakutani writes, "In Miss Tyler's capable hands,...the Morans' outing...becomes a metaphor both for their 28-year marital odyssey, and for the halting, circuitous journey all of us make through life - away from and back to our family roots, out of innocence into sorrow, wisdom and loss.  To followers of the author's work, the Morans will be instantly recognizable as Tyler creations. There's a quaint, homespun quality to them that, given a less talented and generous writer, might seem cloying or sentimental....Miss Tyler is able to examine, again, the conflict, felt by nearly all her characters, between domesticity and freedom, between heredity and independence. In addition, she is able, with her usual grace and magnanimity, to chronicle the ever-shifting covenants made by parents and children, husbands and wives, and in doing so, to depict both the losses - and redemptions - wrought by the passage of time."

Edward Hoagland wrote: "Anne Tyler, who is blessedly prolific and graced with an effortless-seeming talent at describing whole rafts of intricately individualized people, might be described as a domestic novelist, one of that great line descending from Jane Austen. She is interested not in divorce or infidelity, but in marriage -- not very much in isolation, estrangement, alienation and other fashionable concerns, but in courtship, child raising and filial responsibility. It's...a mark of her competence that in this fractionated era she can write so well about blood links and family funerals, old friendships or the dogged pull of thwarted love, of blunted love affairs or marital mismatches that neither mend nor end. Her eye is kindly, wise and versatile (an eye that you would want on your jury if you ever had to stand trial), and after going at each new set of characters with authorial eagerness and an exuberant tumble of details, she tends to arrive at a set of conclusions about them that is a sort of golden mean."

Awards
Breathing Lessons won the Pulitzer Prize for Fiction in 1989 and was a finalist for the 1988 National Book Award. It was also Time's Book of the Year.

References

External links

Photos of the first edition of Breathing Lessons

1988 American novels
Pulitzer Prize for Fiction-winning works
Alfred A. Knopf books
Novels set in Baltimore
American novels adapted into films
English-language books
Novels set in one day